, also known as Miyazaki Yūzensai or Yūzenzai, was a Japanese fan painter who perfected the  fabric dyeing technique.

Biography 
Miyazaki was born in Kyoto in 1654. Miyazaki painted his most popular fan designs on kimono, and they were wildly popular. He used rice paste to resist-dye the cloth in a method that he named . It later became known as simply . This technique made it easier for Miyazaki to paint his designs directly on the kimono, making them more expressive.

References 

1654 births
1736 deaths
Japanese textile artists